is a Japanese football player, who plays for Briobecca Urayasu as a forward.

Career
He was part of Kashiwa Reysol's youth ranks and then he graduated at Tokai University. Finished the college, he decided to sign for Blaublitz Akita for the 1st season of J3 League. In January 2016, he switched to Fujieda MYFC.

Club statistics
Updated to 23 February 2017.

References

External links

Profile at Fujieda MYFC

1992 births
Living people
Tokai University alumni
Association football people from Chiba Prefecture
Japanese footballers
J3 League players
Blaublitz Akita players
Fujieda MYFC players
Vonds Ichihara players
Association football forwards